Community-Managed assets or organizations are those that are owned and controlled through some representative mechanisms that allow a community to influence their operation or use and to enjoy the benefits arising.

Benefits of ownership in infrastructure projects such as dams and irrigation are claimed to include increased responsiveness to needs of that community and the community valuing the projects more highly.

Community land buyouts
Communities can sometimes buy the land they live on and manage them through locally-run trusts. There are many examples of this in Scotland including Eigg, Assynt and Ulva.

Community owned enterprises

In Saranac Lake, New York, after the local Ames Department Store closed due to bankruptcy and residents were forced to travel 50 miles to Plattsburgh for staples, the town was approached by Walmart which offered to build a 250,000 square foot supercenter, but it was felt by the community that Walmart would negatively impact local business and increase traffic. As an alternative a community-owned store was organized and shares were sold to community residents. $500,000 was raised by about 600 residents who made an average investment of $800. goal last spring. The store, Saranac Lake Community Store, opened in October 29, 2011 in remodeled facilities in downtown Saranac Lake. Powell, Wyoming, also has a community store established in 2002 under similar circumstances. In both instances the securities were intrastate offerings registered under less onerous state securities laws rather than federal law. Funds were raised in a similar way for an independent bookstore in Brooklyn, a coffeehouse in Oakland, and restaurants in Hastings-on-Hudson, New York and Hardwick, Vermont. In Hardwick two enterprises were created, one which operates a restaurant which prepares meals using locally grown food, another which bought and equipped the location as a restaurant. 

The New Rules Project of the Institute for Local Self-Reliance a nonprofit corporation has worked to make financing of community owned business less onerous. H.R.2930, the Entrepreneur Access to Capital Act  , would relax securities law requirements making it easier for a community to raise money for community owned enterprises.

Examples
 WindShare (community owned wind power co-operative)
 Community wind energy
 Green Bay Packers
 Winnipeg Blue Bombers

See also   

 Commons
 Cooperative
 List of fan-owned sports teams

Notes

External links and further reading
Bryden, J and Geisler, C (2007) Land Reform and Community - a ‘new wave’ land reform? Land Use Policy
Community Owned Business This article by the American Independent Business Alliance explains the distinctions between community-owned and cooperative businesses and indexes many examples of community-owned enterprises in different business sectors.
"Love a Local Business? Advise it to be careful about selling shares!" blog post by Katovich Law Group
"Local Stock Exchanges and National Stimulus" by Michael H. Shuman, originally published in the Federal Reserve Bank of San Francisco's Community Development Investment Review Volume 5, Issue 2, 2009
"Community Development Investment Review" Volume 5, Issue 2, 2009, foreword by David Erickson, Federal Reserve Bank of San Francisco
Full review
Could “Small Is Beautiful” Replace “Too Big to Fail?” Don Shaffer, RSF Social Finance
New move over land reform, BBC News Online, 19 August 2003

Anarchist theory
Cooperatives
Socialism